A King & Two Queens is an album by American country music artist George Jones and features duets with Melba Montgomery and Judy Lynn, released in 1964 on the United Artists Records.  Jones and Montgomery had scored a number one country hit with the duet "We Must Have Been Out Of Our Minds" in 1963 and released the album What's In Our Heart the same year.  Jones and Montgomery popularized the male-female country singer genre throughout the decade.  Lynn, a former beauty queen who had joined a nationwide tour of Grand Ole Opry performers as a teenager, sings on three of the tracks.

Track listing
"Brown to Blue"
"The Face"
duet with Melba Montgomery
"Almost Out of My Mind"
"Wrong Number"
"I Can't Change Overnight"
duet with Melba Montgomery
"Unexpected Guest"
duet with Judy Lynn
"Without a Reason"
"I'll Always Keep on Loving You"
duet with Melba Montgomery
"My Tears Are on the Roses"
duet with Judy Lynn
"Please Talk to My Heart"
"Big Big Heartaches"
duet with Melba Montgomery
"Antique in My Closet"
duet with Judy Lynn

External links
 George Jones' Official Website
 Record Label

1964 compilation albums
George Jones compilation albums
Judy Lynn albums
Melba Montgomery albums
United Artists Records compilation albums
Vocal duet albums